The EPs is the first compilation album by Italian Gothic Metal band Lacuna Coil, 18 July 2005. Tracks are taken from the two EPs, Lacuna Coil & Halflife.

Track listing

Personnel 
 Cristina Scabbia – Female Vocals
 Andrea Ferro – Male Vocals, Growls
 Marco Coti Zelati – Bass
 Raffaele Zagaria – Guitars (tracks 1-6)
 Claudio Leo – Guitars (tracks 1-6)
 Leonardo Forti – Drums (tracks 1-6)
 Marco Biazzi – Guitars (tracks 7-11)
 Cristiano Migliore – Guitars (tracks 7-11)
 Cristiano Mozzati – Drums  (tracks 7-11)

2005 compilation albums
Lacuna Coil albums